In the Morning is the title of:

Songs
 "Into the Morning" (song), by Canadian band The Weekend
 "In the Morning" (Boom Crash Opera song), 1993
 "In the Morning" (J. Cole song)
 "In the Morning" (The Coral song)
 "In the Morning" (Jack Johnson song)
 "In the Morning" (Razorlight song)
 "In the Morning" (Jennifer Lopez song), 2020
"In the Morning" (Itzy song), 2021
 "In the Morning", song by the Bee Gees
 "In the Morning", also known as "Morning of My Life", a song written by Barry Gibb
 "In the Morning", song by Irving Berlin, performed by Al Jolson in Mammy
 "In the Morning", song by American rock band Built to Spill from There's Nothing Wrong with Love
 "In the Morning", song by Graham Coxon 
 "In the Morning", song by E-40 from the album "Revenue Retrievin': Overtime Shift" (2011)
 "In the Morning", song by Aretha Franklin from the album "A Rose Is Still a Rose" (1998)
 "In the Morning", song by Jefferson Airplane
 "In the Morning", song by The Trews from their album The Trews

See also
ITM (disambiguation)